Eidos-Montréal is a Canadian video game developer based in Montreal and part of Embracer Group. The studio was founded by Stéphane D'Astous in 2007 under SCi Entertainment. It became part of Square Enix Europe in 2009 and CDE Entertainment in 2022.

History 
Eidos Interactive announced plans to open a Montreal-based subsidiary studio in February 2007. Eidos-Montréal formally opened with general manager Stéphane D'Astous on 26 November 2007. According to D'Astous, unlike other video game development studios, Eidos-Montréal's development cycle as characterized by smaller teams (totalling to 350) working over a longer period.

The same year as its founding, the studio announced to work on a Deus Ex project. In May 2009, the studio announced to work on the fourth installment of the Thief series. D'Astous resigned from Eidos-Montréal on 19 July 2013, citing irreconcilable differences with parent company Square Enix. In an 2022 interview, he retroactively called Eidos group a "trainwreck in slow motion", blaming London and Japan headquarters for failing to utilize the full potential of the studios. On 4 March 2014, Square Enix announced that 27 employees were laid off from Eidos-Montréal.

On January 26, 2017, Square Enix announced a partnership with Marvel Entertainment to create multiple video games based on Marvel properties, the first of which was announced as Avengers, based on the comics of the same name, which would be developed by Crystal Dynamics and Eidos Montreal. In May 2018, the studio had over 500 employees. In April 2018, YouTube journalist George Weidman (Super Bunnyhop) reported on a cancelled video game codenamed "Fantasy Project W" that was in development in 2012. In an interview with PCGamesN in May, studio head David Anfossi said he couldn't comment on the report, but found the video "very well done" and "very funny to watch". He explained that, within the video game industry, projects are often started but eventually cancelled. In 2019, Eidos-Shanghai became part of Eidos-Montréal. That studio had been established in 2008 to handle outsourcing for Eidos studios.

In June 2020, Square Enix announced new research and development studio Eidos-Sherbrooke, led by Julien Bouvrais. It was envisioned to take advantage of the nearby Université de Sherbrooke and Bishop's University and bring in new computing technology from these schools into their games. It was said to initially operate remotely, with plans move to a permanent location in southern Quebec in 2021 and to grow from 20 to 100 staff. On June 13, 2021, during their panel for E3 2021, it was announced that the company would be developing a game based on Guardians of the Galaxy.

In May 2022, Square Enix reached an agreement with Embracer Group to purchase the studio and other assets of Square Enix Europe. During the announcement of this acquisition, it was revealed that Eidos had several projects in development, all using Unreal Engine 5. On 20 May 2022, Embracer Group (before the acquisition was complete) expressed interest in sequels, remakes and remasters in established franchises of the studio such as Deus Ex and Thief. The acquisition was completed on August 26, 2022, with the assets being held under CDE Entertainment. In November 2022, Eidos-Shanghai was detached from Eidos-Montréal and moved to Gearbox Entertainment, another Embracer Group company, as Gearbox Studio Shanghai.

Technology 
On December 4, 2014, Eidos revealed their proprietary technology called Dawn Engine which was to be used in future Deus Ex projects, first (and only one utilizing Dawn) of which was later revealed to be Deus Ex: Mankind Divided. It is based on a heavily modified version of IO Interactive's Glacier 2, which has its roots in Hitman: Absolution. The engine was created after developers at Eidos-Montréal "found that [their] creative vision was somehow limited" by relying on existing engines. The graphics engine has been "almost completely" rewritten. This was done to "fully leverage the power offered by the PC and [eighth-gen] consoles". The creation of Dawn was challenging even for Eidos-Montréal's most experienced staff. The engine was later used for 2021's Marvel's Guardians of the Galaxy. 

Dawn Engine features improved conversation system and cutscenes compared to Glacier 2. Built on an "entity system", Dawn allows designers to create new behaviours without the assistance of programmers. Hair technology is an improved version of AMD's TressFX, which has been developed by the in-house research and development team Labs. Dawn features systems for volumetric lighting and air density, as well as support for dense indoor and outdoor areas, and many dynamic objects. Not all objects are rendered at the same time, the engine makes use of Umbra occlusion culling. With Marvel's Guardians of the Galaxy, ray tracing and DLSS support was added, as well as working in-game mirrors.

Eidos-Montréal subsequently abandoned work with the Dawn Engine after 2022, adopting Unreal Engine 5 for their ongoing work to "focus on content" rather than technical hurdles of developing a game and its engine simultaneously. With the foundation of Eidos-Sherbrooke, research and development work was mostly offloaded to that studio including Eidos-Labs department.

Games developed

References

External links 
 

2007 establishments in Quebec
2022 mergers and acquisitions
Canadian companies established in 2007
Canadian subsidiaries of foreign companies
Companies based in Montreal
Eidos
Embracer Group
Square Enix
Video game companies established in 2007
Video game companies of Canada
Video game development companies